The KM-SAM ( "Cheongung", Hanja: 天弓) which is also known as the Cheolmae-2 is a South Korean medium range surface-to-air missile (SAM) system that was developed by the Agency for Defense Development (ADD) with technical support from Almaz-Antey and Fakel, based on technology from the 9M96 missile used on S-350E and S-400 missile systems.

Design and development
A complete battery consists of four to six 8-cell transporter erector launchers (TELs), a passive electronically scanned array (PESA) X-band multi-function phased array 3D radar (based on the one from the Russian S-400), and a fire command vehicle. The radar operates in the X-band and rotates at a rate of 40 rpm, covering up to 80 degrees in elevation. It can detect targets within  and track up to 40 simultaneously.

The KM-SAM is the middle-tier of South Korea's three-tier aerial and missile defense system. Though it was developed in Russia by the Almaz Design Bureau with assistance from Samsung Thales, LIG Nex1, and Doosan DST, localization and industrialization were done in South Korea enough to consider it an indigenous system. It is to replace upgraded MIM-23 Hawk batteries in South Korea and be made available for export. Almaz-Antey continued with the program after prototypes were transferred and have created a distinctly Russian version called the Vityaz missile system.

The Republic of Korea Air Force revealed in mid-2015 that the KM-SAM would soon enter mass production and begin delivery to the Air Force that September, replacing the Hawk missile that had been in Korean service since 1964, which the United States military retired in 2002. The system can intercept up to six targets simultaneously, and the missiles have anti-electronic warfare capabilities to keep functioning despite jamming. The system passed the military's operational requirement verification test in July 2015, and began deployment in early 2016 near the maritime border with North Korea in the Yellow Sea.

On 28 April 2020, the Defense Acquisition Program Administration (DAPA) announced that deliveries of the Cheongung KM-SAM Block-1 system to the ROKAF had been completed. In July 2021, South Korea retired its last MIM-23 Hawk system, phasing it out for the Cheongung Block-1.

KM-SAM battery configuration
 Engagement Control Center (ECS): 1
 Multifunction Radar (MFR): 1
 Launchers: 4–6
 Missiles per Launcher: 8
 Power Generator: 1

Further development
Performance levels were to be twice as superior to the Patriot and Cheolmae II missiles, and was expected to be based on the Russian S-400 technology. This role was filled by the development of the L-SAM.

In April 2017, South Korean military officials revealed that a low-tier missile defense system based on the Cheongung was in the final phase of development. The first upgraded Cheongung-II system was delivered to the ROKAF in November 2020. The Block II interceptor is effective against both aircraft and ballistic targets.

The KM-SAM will be able to be launched from the Korean Vertical Launch System (K-VLS) aboard Daegu-class frigates in a naval role.

Exports
LIG Nex1 participated in International Defence Exhibition held in the UAE in 2021 and showed off the Korean weapon system including KM-SAM and AT-1K Raybolt.

On 16 November 2021, the UAE's Ministry of Defense tweeted that it plans to acquire the M-SAM as a "qualitative addition" to its existing air defense capabilities and that the deal could reach USD 3.5 billion. An official at South Korea's Defense Acquisition Program Administration (DAPA) said that the announcement  was "positive" but "we still need to see how negotiations on the details will proceed." On 16 January 2022, the Defense Acquisition Program Administration of the South Korean Government announced that the UAE would purchase the system in a deal worth $3.5 billion. At the time, it was the largest arms export deal ever made by South Korea.

The US requested South Korea to send this missile system to Ukraine for the War in Ukraine. However South Korea declined on the basis of its security situation.

Operators
 - Republic of Korea Air Force 
  - United Arab Emirates Army

See also
 L-SAM
 KP-SAM Shingung
 Vityaz missile system
 Type 03 Chū-SAM
 HQ-16

References

External links
 official site

21st-century surface-to-air missiles
Post–Cold War weapons of South Korea
Surface-to-air missiles of South Korea
Almaz-Antey products
Republic of Korea Air Force
Missile defense